Deania is a genus of long-snouted, deepwater dogfish sharks in the family Centrophoridae.

Species
 Deania calcea R. T. Lowe, 1839 (birdbeak dogfish)
 Deania hystricosa Garman, 1906 (rough longnose dogfish)
 Deania profundorum H. M. Smith & Radcliffe, 1912 (arrowhead dogfish)
 Deania quadrispinosa McCulloch, 1915 (longsnout dogfish)

Habitats
In the North Atlantic Waters, three species of the genus Deania have been reported; Deania calcea, Deania hystricosa and Deania profundorum. However, in the North Spanish waters, only Deania calcea and Deania profundorum have been caught.

Taxonomy
Deania species have two dorsal fins with strong grooved spines, no anal fin, and a strong sub terminal notch on the caudal fin. Typically, identification characteristics such as dermal denticles and teeth have been utilized to distinguish between elasmobranch species.

See also

 List of prehistoric cartilaginous fish

References

Sources
 
 Tony Ayling & Geoffrey Cox, Collins Guide to the Sea Fishes of New Zealand,  (William Collins Publishers Ltd, Auckland, New Zealand 1982) 

 
Aquitanian genus first appearances
Extant Miocene first appearances
Shark genera
Taxa named by David Starr Jordan
Taxa named by John Otterbein Snyder